Nadiem Amiri (born 27 October 1996) is a German professional footballer who plays as an attacking midfielder for Bayer Leverkusen and the Germany national team.

Club career

1899 Hoffenheim
Amiri joined 1899 Hoffenheim in 2012 from Waldhof Mannheim. He made his Bundesliga debut on 7 February 2015 against VfL Wolfsburg in a 3–0 away defeat. Amiri recorded his first goal of the season and for his club in a 3–3 draw to Borussia Mönchengladbach on 28 November. On 30 April 2016, he scored the winning goal in the 84th minute to defeat FC Ingolstadt 04 with a 2–1 victory. On 12 June 2017, he signed a contract extension which lasts until 2020. On 20 October, Amiri scored a goal in a 3–1 UEFA Europa League victory over İstanbul Başakşehir F.K. and sealed their club's first ever victory in Europe.

Bayer Leverkusen
Amiri signed a five-year contract with Bayer Leverkusen in July 2019.

Genoa
On 29 January 2022, he joined Genoa in Italy on loan. Genoa would have held an obligation to buy his rights at the end of the loan if certain conditions were met.

International career

Youth
Amiri made his debut for Germany under-21 in March 2016, coming on as a late substitute in a European U21 Championship qualifier against Russia under-21. He was the part of the Germany under-21 team that won the 2017 UEFA European Under-21 Championship by defeating Spain under-21 in the final.

Amiri was selected as one of three overage players for the Tokyo Olympics, where he scored in each of Germany's first two games, a defeat to Brazil and a victory over Saudi Arabia.

Senior
Amiri made his Germany national team debut on 9 October 2019 in a friendly against Argentina. He substituted Julian Brandt in the 66th minute.

Personal life
Amiri was born in Ludwigshafen to an Afghan Tajik family. His parents come from Herat Province of Afghanistan. His cousins, Zubayr Amiri, Nauwid Amiri and Ramin Amiri, also play football.

Career statistics

International

Honours
Germany
 UEFA European Under-21 Championship: 2017

Individual
 Bundesliga Goal of the Month: January 2021

References

External links

 
 

1996 births
Living people
Sportspeople from Ludwigshafen
Footballers from Rhineland-Palatinate
Association football midfielders
German footballers
Germany youth international footballers
Germany under-21 international footballers
Olympic footballers of Germany
Germany international footballers
German people of Afghan descent
Sportspeople of Afghan descent
TSG 1899 Hoffenheim II players
TSG 1899 Hoffenheim players
Bayer 04 Leverkusen players
Genoa C.F.C. players
Bundesliga players
Regionalliga players
Serie A players
Footballers at the 2020 Summer Olympics
German expatriate footballers
Expatriate footballers in Italy
German expatriate sportspeople in Italy